Francisco Javier Prieto Caroca (born 1 July 1983) is a Chilean former footballer who played as a goalkeeper.

Honours

Club
Colo-Colo
 Primera División de Chile (1): 2009 Clausura

External links

Football-Lineups profile

1983 births
Living people
Chilean footballers
Association football goalkeepers
Chilean Primera División players
Primera B de Chile players
C.D. Arturo Fernández Vial footballers
Santiago Wanderers footballers
Cobreloa footballers
Colo-Colo footballers
San Antonio Unido footballers
Cobresal footballers
Segunda División players
CD Mirandés footballers
SD Ponferradina players
Chile international footballers
Chilean expatriate footballers
Expatriate footballers in Spain
Chilean expatriate sportspeople in Spain
People from Antofagasta